Anders Nyström (born 22 April 1975), also known as Blakkheim (or formerly Blackheim), is a Swedish musician.

Biography 
Nyström founded the Swedish metal band Katatonia with singer Jonas Renkse in 1991. Nyström is involved in the songwriting, backing vocals, keyboards, programming, arrangements, art direction and production of Katatonia along with Renkse.

He used to be a member of the metal band Bewitched from 1995 to 1997 and is still with Jonas Renkse on the death metal project Bloodbath. He has released four albums as the solo black metal act Diabolical Masquerade (1993–2004).

Discography

With Diabolical Masquerade 
 Ravendusk in My Heart CD 1996
 The Phantom Lodge CD 1997
 Nightwork CD 1999
 Death's Design CD 2001

With Katatonia 
 Jhva Elohim Meth... The Revival (1992) (EP)
 Dance of December Souls (1993)
 For Funerals to Come... (1995) (EP)
 Brave Murder Day (1996)
 Sounds of Decay (1997) (EP)
 Discouraged Ones (1998)
 Saw You Drown (1998) (EP)
 Tonight's Decision (1999)
 Teargas (2001) (EP)
 Last Fair Deal Gone Down (2001)
 Tonight's Music (2001) (EP)
 The Black Sessions (Best of double disc set with a live DVD) (2005)
 Viva Emptiness (2003)
 The Great Cold Distance (2006)
 Live Consternation (including live DVD) (2007)
 Night Is the New Day (2009)
 The Longest Year (2010) (EP)
 Buildings (2012) (EP)
 Dead End Kings (2012)
 The Fall of Hearts (2016)
 City Burials (2020)
 Sky Void of Stars (2023)

With Bloodbath 
 Breeding Death (2000)
 Resurrection Through Carnage (2002)
 Nightmares Made Flesh (2005)
 Unblessing the Purity (2008)
 The Fathomless Mastery (2008)
 The Wacken Carnage (2008, CD/DVD)
 Bloodbath over Bloodstock (2011, DVD)
 Grand Morbid Funeral (2014)
 The Arrow of Satan Is Drawn (2018)

With Bewitched 
 Diabolical Desecration CD 1996
 Encyclopedia of Evil MCD 1996
 Pentagram Prayer CD 1997

Guest appearances 
 Cancer – guitar on the track "Ballcutter" from the album Shadow Gripped (2019)
 Novembre – guest lead guitar on "Annoluce" from the Peaceville release URSA

References

External links 
 

Swedish heavy metal guitarists
Living people
1975 births
Bloodbath members
Katatonia members
Black metal musicians
Death metal musicians
21st-century guitarists